Johann Ernst of Nassau-Weilburg (Weilburg, 13 June 1664 – Heidelberg, 27 February 1719) was an Imperial Generalfeldmarschall, from 1675 to 1688 Count and from 1688 until his death Prince (Fürst) of Nassau-Weiburg.

Biography 
Johann Ernst was the eldest son of Frederick, Count of Nassau-Weilburg (1640–1675) and Christiane Elisabeth of Sayn-Wittgenstein (1646–1678). After the death of his parents, his regents were Johann, Count of Nassau-Idstein and after his death, Johann Louis, Count of Nassau-Ottweiler.
 
In Juli 1679 Johann Ernst started his studies at the University of Tübingen. Between 1681 and 1682 he stayed at the court of King Louis XIV of France in the Palace of Versailles.

Johann Ernst became the only ruler of Nassau-Weilburg when his brother Frederick William Louis was killed in 1684 during the siege of Buda. His territories on the left bank of the Rhine were occupied by France and only returned after the Treaty of Ryswick in 1697.

Johann Ernst had an important military career. In 1684 he commanded a Dragoon regiment in the service of the Landgraviate of Hesse-Kassel. In 1688, at the start of the Nine Years' War, he defended Koblenz. Later he participated in the Siege of Mainz (1689), the Battle of Fleurus (1690) and the Battle of Landen (1693).

In September 1696 Johann Ernst entered as general in the service of the Electoral Palatinate as General, which enraged his former employer Charles I, Landgrave of Hesse-Kassel.
After the Peace of Ryswick, Johann Ernst became governor of the Palatinate city of Düsseldorf.

In 1701, at the outbreak of the War of Spanish Succession, Johann Ernst raised an army, participated in the successful Siege of Landau in 1702 and the consequent chasing of an army under Marshal of France Tallard from the Hunsrück. For this achievement, he was made an Imperial Generalfeldmarschall.

When Prince Eugene of Savoy marched in 1703 to Bavaria against the French Marshal Villars, Johann Ernst stayed on the Rhine to defend Landau against Tallard. This led on November 15, 1703, to the Battle of Speyerbach. It was a terrible defeat. 8000 men were lost and Johann Ernst's eldest son, Colonel Frederick Ludwig of Nassau-Weilburg was killed. Hereafter, Johann Ernst never fought a major engagement again and withdrew from active service all together in 1706. He was Großhofmeister of the Elector Palatinate until 1716 and returned to Weilburg, where he died in 1719.

Building 
In the 1700s, Johann Ernst initiated the expansion of his residence, Schloss Weilburg, from a Renaissance Palace to a Baroque complex, adding orangeries, stables, a church and terrace gardens.

Marriage and issue 
Johann Ernst married on April 3, 1683, Countess Maria Polyxena of Leiningen-Dagsburg-Hartenburg (February 7, 1662 – April 22, 1725), daughter of Friedrich Emich, Count of Leiningen-Dagsburg-Hartenburg (1621-1698) and Countess Sybille von Waldeck-Wildungen (1619-1678).

They had nine children:
 Frederick Louis (1683–1703), killed in the Battle of Speyerbach
 Charles August (1685–1753) married Princess Auguste Friederike Wilhelmine of Nassau-Idstein (1699-1750)
 Maria Polyxena (1686–1687)
 Johanna Louise (1687–1688)
 Charles Ernst (1689–1709)
 Henry Louis (1690–1691)
 Magdalena Henriette (1691–1725) married Frederick William, 1st Prince of Solms-Braunfels
 Albertina (1693–1748)
 a daughter (1694)

Ancestors

References 
 Ernst Joachim: Johann Ernst von Nassau-Weilburg, in: Allgemeine Deutsche Biographie (1881), S. 272-273
 Dr. C. Spielmann: Geschichte der Stadt und Herrschaft Weilburg, 1896, Neuauflage 2003

External links 

  Worldroots
  Weilburg

|-

1675 births
1719 deaths
Counts of Nassau
University of Tübingen alumni
German army commanders in the War of the Spanish Succession
House of Nassau-Weilburg
People from Weilburg
Burials in the Royal Crypt of Weilburg Schlosskirche
Field marshals of Germany
Generals of the Holy Roman Empire
Military personnel from Hesse